Georges Mill is an unincorporated village in northern Loudoun County, Virginia. The community takes its name from the mill that once operated there on Dutchman Creek to the north of Elvan. Georges Mill is located at the crossroads of Irish Corner Road (VA 673) and Georges Mill Road (VA 852).

Unincorporated communities in Loudoun County, Virginia
Washington metropolitan area
Unincorporated communities in Virginia